Wurdulac, also spelled wurdalak or verdilak, is a vampire in the Slavic folklore mythology. Some Western sources define it as a type of "Russian vampire" that must consume the blood of its loved ones and convert its whole family. This notion is based apparently on Alexey K. Tolstoy's novella The Family of the Vourdalak, telling the story of one such Slavic family. 

In Russia the common name for vampire (or wurdulac) is "upyr". Nowadays the three terms are regarded as synonymous, but in 19th century they were seen as separate, although similar entities. The Russian upyr was said to be a former witch, werewolf or a particularly nasty sinner who had been excommunicated from the church. In Ukraine the upyrs were also feared as the vampires who could bring about droughts and epidemics.  

In Russian language the word "wurdulac" first appeared in early 19th century, and became common due to Alexander Pushkin's 1836 poem of the same name, part of the Songs of the Western Slavs cycle. It is the corrupt form of the West Slavic word "volkodlak", meaning literally "wolf-fur" or "wolf-hide" (i.e., it denotes someone "wearing" a wolf's skin; a werewolf).

See also
 
 Vrykolakas

References

Russian mythology
Vampires
Slavic legendary creatures